Ok (1198 m) is a shield volcano in Iceland, to the west of Langjökull.  It erupted during interglacials in the Pleistocene. The volcano was once topped by the Okjökull glacier, which is now thought to have disappeared. The lost glacier was the subject of a documentary, Not Ok , in 2018, produced by Cymene Howe and Dominic Boyer. In August 2019, the glacier was memorialised with a plaque on site, the English text of which, written by Andri Snær Magnason, reads:
A letter to the futureOk is the first Icelandic glacier to lose its status as a glacier. In the next 200 years all our glaciers are expected to follow the same path. This monument is to acknowledge that we know what is happening and what needs to be done. Only you know if we did it.August 2019415PPM CO2

References

External links

Shield volcanoes of Iceland
Pleistocene shield volcanoes
West Volcanic Zone of Iceland